Mark Goldberg is an entrepreneur and English football club chairman and manager.

Business
Mark Goldberg started out in the recruitment industry in 1984. Between 1992 and 1998 he built one of the UK's fastest growing IT contracting companies which doubled its turnover for five consecutive years resulting in a public flotation in 1996 at a market value capitalization of £36m as MSB INTERNATIONAL PLC. Goldberg sold a majority of his shareholding in 1998 at market cap of £200m. He was declared bankrupt in 2000.

In 2000 Goldberg founded The TV Jobshop – Sky digital channel which advertised job vacancies via the TV channel. Whilst the concept was not successful in its original form, with reinvention, Goldberg adapted the model to become Viavision Ltd, which developed into one of Europe's largest independent satellite broadcasting corporations incorporating Jobs TV, Exchange & Mart TV, Sport xxx, TV and Poker TV. This ultimately led to a successful merger with Youmedia PLC in 2005.

In 2006 Goldberg coordinated the purchase of the Central Nic domain registry business out of administration, which owned UK.com, US.com, CN.Com plus other top domains. Goldberg helped to provide infrastructure for scalable growth, resulting in a successful public flotation 2013 on AIM at Market Cap £55m.

Since 2016 Goldberg has been co-founder and chairman of Recruiterlink, a recruitment technology platform providing recruitment tools to freelance recruiters worldwide. He has also developed a series of online life skills courses known under the brand name of StayingInTheGame.com.

Football

Playing career
As a player, Goldberg played for non-League clubs Bromley and Beckenham Town, where he was player-manager while still in his 20s.

He also played football for two seasons in the United States, from 1982 to 1983, at the College of William and Mary, after being recruited by its head coach, Al Albert.

Crystal Palace

Goldberg became owner and chairman of Crystal Palace Football Club in June 1998. Goldberg was unable to raise sufficient funds to achieve his plan for the club, ultimately resulting in the club being forced into administration and leading to his personal bankruptcy.

Goldberg had purchased the club from long-serving chairman Ron Noades, but Palace ended up relegated from the FA Premier League that season – for the third time in six years. The takeover deal also saw Italian Serie A side Juventus have a 10% stake in Palace, with a view to Juventus players being loaned or sold to the club. Goldberg also set a target into turning Palace into a leading European club by 2003.

At the end of the 1997–98 season, Goldberg appointed Terry Venables as head coach for the following season and former manager Steve Coppell became Director of football. The club was not successful under his chairmanship and in January 1999 it was taken over by administrators who counted £22 million of debts, including £2m owed to Terry Venables and £7m to banks, the remainder to football clubs, players and HMRC. The club also failed to reach the standards set when Goldberg took over, with their financial crisis not being solved until a takeover by Simon Jordan was completed more than a year later, and a return to the Premier League was not achieved until 2004.

Bromley
Goldberg was player manager for a short period in 1988. He re-joined Bromley FC as first team manager in 2005, Appointed by his brother-in-law and Bromley chairman, Jerry Dolke, Goldberg replaced in incumbent manager George Wakeling and his management team.

Goldberg's start in management was successful, leading Bromley to promotion into the Conference South division via the play-offs. His first pre-season included a tie against the youth team of Crystal Palace and his competitive start was good, with Bromley topping the Premier Division after his first eleven games and reaching the First Round of the FA Cup before losing 4–1 to League One side Gillingham.

Goldberg left Bromley during the 2007–08 season, to be succeeded by Simon Osborn, but returned to the club at the end of the season. In April 2009, Goldberg suffered serious damage to his knee ligament while playing for Bromley Veterans in an Isthmian Veterans Cup semi-final.

Goldberg guided the club to promotion from the Ryman Premier Division during his first season after winning the Play Off Final against Billericay FC.

During his term, Goldberg guided the club to win 3 trophies amongst the Kent and London Senior Cup competitions as well as leading the club to reach the FA Cup First Round, during 5 out of his 8 seasons as manager.

Goldberg agreed to step down as manager on 4 February 2016.

Welling United
Goldberg became manager of Welling United in April 2016. He left the position in November 2016.

Personal life
Goldberg's son, Bradley, is a semi-professional footballer. Goldberg also has a daughter, Lauren-Rose.

Honours

Club
Bromley
Conference South: 2014–15
Isthmian League playoff winners: 2006–07
Kent Senior Cup (2): 2005–06, 2006–07
London Senior Cup: 2012–13

References

Year of birth missing (living people)
Living people
English businesspeople
English football chairmen and investors
Crystal Palace F.C. directors and chairmen
William & Mary Tribe men's soccer players
Beckenham Town F.C. players
Bromley F.C. players
English football managers
Bromley F.C. managers
Beckenham Town F.C. managers
Welling United F.C. managers
National League (English football) managers
Association footballers not categorized by position
English footballers